The All-Ireland Senior Hurling Championship 1895 was the ninth series of the All-Ireland Senior Hurling Championship, Ireland's premier hurling knock-out competition.  Tipperary won the championship, beating Kilkenny 6-8 to 1-10 in the final.

Format

All-Ireland Championship

Final: (1 match) The two provincial representatives make up the two final teams with the winners being declared All-Ireland champions.

Results

Leinster Senior Hurling Championship

Munster Senior Hurling Championship

All-Ireland Senior Hurling Championship

Championship statistics

Miscellaneous

 Cork did not field a team in this year's championship as a protest over the awarding of the 1893 All-Ireland football championship to Dublin.

References

Sources

 Corry, Eoghan, The GAA Book of Lists (Hodder Headline Ireland, 2005).
 Donegan, Des, The Complete Handbook of Gaelic Games (DBA Publications Limited, 2005).

1895
All-Ireland Senior Hurling Championship